Legacy is the fourth studio album by Tunisian progressive metal band Myrath, released on 19 February 2016. The name of the album is also the name of the band when translated to English.

As the band prepared it, they were already thinking of its successor Shehili. According to them, songs from both efforts are connected. It was originally planned for a 12 February release.

The song "Believer" was described as "an anthem for those who doubt, who are scared, who want to give up, who suffer." Following a crowdfunding campaign, the band spent € 45,000 to hire two Game of Thrones producers for the track's video. They initially wanted to create something that strayed from what they called Tunisian "clichés", but after receiving no replies from the local government with regards to authorization to shoot images in certain locations, they changed their concept.

Reception 

Metal Hammers Dave Ling praised the blend of metal and oriental traditional elements, saying the addition of the latter does not "completely diminish the album's metal cred" and finished his review by saying Legacy "won't be for everyone, but adventurous souls will love it".

Chris Martin called Legacy "a brilliant spectacle morphing melodic progressive metal with stunning Arabic keyboard swaths and vocal melodies that hearken to the sounds of the Orient" in his review for My Global Mind. He also considered it their best album and a possible candidate for album of the year.

Track listing

Personnel
Per the band's official website:

Myrath 
 Zaher Zorgati - lead and backing vocals
 Malek Ben Arbia - guitars
 Anis Jouini - bass
 Elyes Bouchoucha - keyboards, backing vocals, arrangements
 Morgan Bethet - drums

Guest musicians
 Bechir Gharbi, Riadh Ben Amor - violins
 Mohamed Gharbi, Hamza Obba - violins and alto
 Akrem Ben Romdhane - oud
 Koutaiba Rahali - gasba, ney
 Aurélien Joucla, Audrey Bedos - choirs

Technical personnel
 Kevin Codfert - producer, arrangements, recording and engineering (the latter two at X fade Studio)
 Fredrik Nordström - mixing
 Jens Bogren - mixing and mastering at Fascination Street Studios
 Perrine Prérez Fuentes - artwork and booklet
 Ayoub Hidri and Martha Vergeot - logo design
 Strings recorded at Studio Event

References

Myrath albums
2016 albums
Nightmare Records albums
King Records (Japan) albums